Borgåsund is a locality in the vicinity of Strömsholm, located in Hallstahammar Municipality in Västmanland County in Sweden with 109 inhabitants in 2005.

Strömsholm Canal ends east of Borgåsund in the lake Mälaren.

References

Populated places in Västmanland County